Nigel Patrick (born Nigel Dennis Patrick Wemyss-Gorman; 2 May 1912 – 21 September 1981) was an English actor and stage director born into a theatrical family.

During the late 1940s and 1950s, he became known as a debonair leading man in British films, though he could also portray rogues. He featured in The Sound Barrier (aka, Breaking Through the Sound Barrier, 1952), under the direction of David Lean.

Biography
Patrick was born in London, England, the son of Thomas Joseph Charles Aubrey Wemyss Gorman (born 1875 – died 19??) and actress Dorothy Hilda Turner (1890–1969).

Stage actor
He made his professional stage debut in The Life Machine at the Regent Theatre, in Kings Cross, London, in 1932 following a period in repertory. Thereafter he appeared in many successful plays, including Half a Crown (1934), Ringmaster (1935), Roulette (1935), The Lady of La Paz (1936) and Madmoiselle (1936)

He starred in the long-running George and Margaret (1937) at the Wyndham's Theatre, which ran for 799 performances.

He followed it with Tony Draws a Horse (1939) and Children to Bless You (1939).

Second World War
His acting career was put on hold until after service in the Second World War, during which, as a Lieutenant-Colonel in the King's Royal Rifle Corps, he fought in the Middle East, North Africa and Italy.

Film career
His debut film performance was as a reporter in a supporting romantic role in Mrs. Pym of Scotland Yard (1940). It was filmed in July 1939 and released the following year. After the war, Patrick appeared in Morning Departure (1946) on TV and Fools Rush In, Tomorrow's Child (1946) and Noose (1947) on stage.

Patrick had film roles in Spring in Park Lane (1948), Uneasy Terms (1948) and notably Noose (1948) playing a spiv. Patrick had a good part in Silent Dust (1948) and was promoted to star for The Jack of Diamonds (1949), which he also co-wrote.

He supported Patricia Roc in The Perfect Woman (1949), and had a key role in the film version of Morning Departure (1950) (a different part to the one he had played on TV).

Patrick was one of several names in Trio (1950) based on stories by W. Somerset Maugham and appeared in the Hollywood-financed Pandora and the Flying Dutchman (1951). He was the young teacher in The Browning Version (1951) with Michael Redgrave, and appeared in a popular comedy Young Wives' Tale (1951). He returned to the world of Maugham with Encore (1951) and was in Who Goes There! (1951) on stage.

Patrick reprised his Who Goes There! (1952) performance on film then played a test pilot in the popular The Sound Barrier (1952). He was then in Meet Me Tonight (1952) and The Pickwick Papers (1952). Due mostly to The Sound Barrier, exhibitors voted Patrick the seventh most popular British film star with the public, in 1952.

Patrick was in Grand National Night (1953) and was the ninth most popular British star. On stage he was in Escapade (1953) and Birthday Honours (1953).

The following year he was in Forbidden Cargo (1954) and was one of several British stars in The Sea Shall Not Have Them (1954). He supported Richard Widmark in A Prize of Gold (1955) for Warwick Films, who announced Patrick might direct In All Dishonesty for them on stage. It did not happen. Instead Patrick starred in a comedy All for Mary (1955). On stage he was in Green Room Rags (1954) and The Remarkable Mr. Pennypacker (1955).

He had a major role in Raintree County (1957).

Director
For Warwick Films, Patrick starred in and directed How to Murder a Rich Uncle (1957).

He supported Jeffrey Hunter in Count Five and Die (1957) and appeared in The Egg (1957) on stage. Patrick made another for Warwick but as an actor only, The Man Inside (1958), with Jack Palance.

On stage Patrick directed No Way to Kill (1958) and Not in the Book (1958) and acted in and directed Pleasure of His Company (1959).

He starred in Sapphire (1959), winner of Best British Film at the 1960 BAFTA Film Awards. It was directed by Basil Dearden who then used Patrick in The League of Gentlemen (1960). On stage he acted in and directed Settled Out of Court (1960).

Patrick made another for Warwick as an actor, The Trials of Oscar Wilde (1960), then made Johnny Nobody (1961) for them as director and actor.

He was in Zero One (1962–1965) on TV and starred in the tough crime thriller The Informers (1963).

Later career
Patrick appeared on stage in The Schoolmistress (1964) and Present Laughter (1965) and he directed Past Imperfect (1964) and Present Laughter (1965) and Alan Ayckbourn's Relatively Speaking (1967) at the Duke of York's Theatre. Film appearances included Battle of Britain (1969), The Virgin Soldiers (1969) and The Executioner (1970). He directed Avanti! (1968) on Broadway.

Other stage appearances included Best of Friends (1970), Reunion in Vienna (1971), Habeas Corpus (1974), The Pay Off (1974), Dear Daddy (1976) and Peter Pan (1978). He also worked steadily as a director.

Personal life and death
He married the actress Beatrice Campbell at St James's, Spanish Place, Marylebone, London on 12 January 1951. She predeceased him in 1979; he died, two years later, from lung cancer, on 21 September 1981.

Filmography

As an actor

 Mrs. Pym of Scotland Yard (1940) as Richard Loddon
 Spring in Park Lane (1948) as Mr. Bacon
 Uneasy Terms (1948) as Lucien Donnelly
 Noose (1948) as Bar Gorman
 Silent Dust (1949) as Simon Rawley
 The Jack of Diamonds (1949) as Alan Butler
 The Perfect Woman (1949) as Roger Cavendish
 Morning Departure (1950) as First Lieutenant Harry Manson
 Trio (1950) as Max Kealada (Segment: "Mr. Know-All") 
 Pandora and the Flying Dutchman (1951) as Stephen Cameron
 The Browning Version (1951) as Frank Hunter
 Young Wives' Tale (1951) as Rodney Pennant
 Encore (1951) as Tom Ramsay (Segment: "The Ant and the Grasshopper") 
 Who Goes There! (1952) as Miles Cornwall
 The Sound Barrier (1952) as Tony Garthwaite
 Meet Me Tonight (1952) as Toby Cartwrigth: Ways and Means
 The Pickwick Papers (1952) as Mr. Jingle
 Grand National Night (1953) as Gerald Coates
 Forbidden Cargo (1954) as Insp. Michael Kenyon
 The Sea Shall Not Have Them (1954) as Flight Sgt. Singsby
 A Prize of Gold (1955) as Brian Hammell
 All for Mary (1955) as Capt. Clive Norton
 How to Murder a Rich Uncle (1957) as Henry
 Raintree County (1957) as Prof. Jerusalem Webster Stiles
 Count Five and Die (1957) as Major Julien Howard
 The Man Inside (1958) as Sam Carter
 Sapphire (1959) as Superintendent Robert Hazard
 The League of Gentlemen (1960) as Race
 The Trials of Oscar Wilde (1960) as Sir Edward Clarke
 Johnny Nobody (1961) as Father Carey
 The Informers (1963) as Chief Insp. John Edward Johnnoe
 Battle of Britain (1969) as Group Captain Hope
 The Virgin Soldiers (1969) as R.S.M. Raskin
 The Executioner (1970) as Colonel Scott
 Tales from the Crypt (1972) as Major William Rogers (segment 5 "Blind Alleys")
 The Great Waltz (1972) as Johann Strauss Sr.
 The Mackintosh Man (1973) as Soames-Trevelyan
 Silver Bears (1978) as Financial Mediator (uncredited)

As a director
 How to Murder a Rich Uncle (1957)
 Johnny Nobody (1961)

As a writer
 The Jack of Diamonds (1949)

As a narrator
 Arrivederci Roma (1958) 
 Goal! (1966)
 The Year of Sir Ivor (1969)

Theatre credits

As an actor

 The Life Machine (1932)
 Half a Crown (1934)
 Ringmaster (1935)
 Roulette (1935)
 The Lady of La Paz (1936)
 Madmoiselle (1936)
 George & Margaret (1937)
 Tony Draws a Horse (1939)
 Children to Bless You (1939)
 Fools Rush In (1946)
 To-morrow's Child (1946)
 Noose (1947)
 Who Goes There! (1951)
 Escapade (1953)
 Birthday Honours (1953)
 Green Room Rags (1954)
 The Remarkable Mr. Pennypacker (1955)
 The Egg (1957)
 Pleasure of His Company (1959)
 Settled Out of Court (1960)
 The Schoolmistress (1964)
 Present Laughter (1965)
 Best of Friends (1970)
 Reunion in Vienna (1971)
 Habeas Corpus (1974)
 The Pay Off (1974)
 Dear Daddy (1976)
 Peter Pan (1978)

As a director/stage manager

 No Way to Kill (1958)
 Not in the Book (1958)
 Pleasure of His Company (1959)
 Settled Out of Court (1960)
 Past Imperfect (1964)
 Present Laughter (1965)
 Relatively Speaking (1967)
 The Others (1967)
 Avanti!' (1968)
 Out of the Question (1968)
 Trio (1969)
 Three (1970)
 The Pay Off (1974)
 Suite in Two Keys (1978)
 The Last of Mrs Cheyney (1980)

Television
 Morning Departure (1946) as Lt-Cmdr. Stanford
 Zero One (1962–65) as Alan Garnett
 It Takes a Thief – "Flowers from Alexander" (1969) 
 Sunday Night Thriller – "Blunt Instrument" (1981) as Hugh Logan

References

External links

 
 
 
 

1912 births
1981 deaths
British Army personnel of World War II
English male film actors
English film directors
English male stage actors
English male television actors
King's Royal Rifle Corps officers
Deaths from lung cancer in England
English Roman Catholics
20th-century English male actors